Simply Laura is an American television series on the Cooking Channel starring Laura Vitale.

Episodes

Season 1

Season 2

References

External links 
 

2010s American cooking television series
2014 American television series debuts
English-language television shows
Cooking Channel original programming